Patricio  Renán (born Renán Patricio Sánchez Gajardo, 4 January 1945 – 5 March 2022), also known as Pato Renán, was a Chilean singer who became famous during the Chilean New Wave (or Chilean "Nueva Ola") era of 1960s music. Known mostly as a rock-pop singer, Renán was also a ballad singer.

Life and career
Renán was born in Concepcion, but he was raised in Penco. In 1965, Renán moved to Santiago, where he debuted as a singer. He was then recognized as one of the "Nueva Ola" stars, (in Chile; there were Nueva Olas also in other Spanish-speaking countries at the same time) alongside other popular Chilean singers of the time such as his friend Cecilia. In 1966, Renán made his international debut, singing at the Festival de Trujillo in Trujillo, Peru. 

Renán recorded ten albums, and he was awarded a "Gaviota de Plata award" at the 1972 Vina del Mar International Song Festival. 

Among his hits are "Por Amor" (not to be confused with a Menudo song of the same name), "Son Recuerdos" and "Soy Culpable".

Death
Renán died of natural causes at home in La Reina, Santiago, on 5 March 2022, at the age of 77. His family was present during his last days.

See also
Chilean rock
List of Chileans

References

External links
 

1945 births
2022 deaths
Chilean male singers
People from Concepción, Chile